Kate Watterson is an author of suspense and romance novels.

Watterson's Ellie MacIntosh series is about a Wisconsin homicide detective. She has also released short stories as e-books that bridge the gaps between the novels.

Watterson has also written romantic suspense, including her Sexual Studies books.

Books

Detective Ellie MacIntosh series
Frozen, Tor Books, 2012
Charred, Tor Books, 2013 
Buried, Tor Books, 2013 
Fractured, Forge Books, 2015
Crushed, Tor Books, 2018
Severed, Tor Books, 2018

Ellie MacIntosh e-books
"Thaw", Tor Books, 2013 
"Bleed", Tor Books, 2013
"Vanished", Tor Books, 2015

Detective Danny Haase series 

 "Summer Treason", Tor Books, 2014
 "The Summer Bones", Tor Books, 2015
 "Blood Is Quicker Than Water", Tor Books, 2015
 "The Opposite House", Tor Books, 2015

Sexual Studies series
Watcher, Siren Publishing, 2007 
Blindsided, Siren Publishing, 2009 
Beautiful Triad, Siren Publishing, 2009

Other books
Picture Perfect, Siren-Bookstrand Inc., 2010
The Best Mistake, Carina Press, 2011 
Reckless Territory, Samhain Publishing, 2012

References

American women novelists
American romantic fiction novelists
American mystery novelists
21st-century American novelists
21st-century American women writers
Living people
Women mystery writers
Women romantic fiction writers
Year of birth missing (living people)